Pi-hole is a Linux network-level advertisement and Internet tracker blocking application which acts as a DNS sinkhole and optionally a DHCP server, intended for use on a private network. It is designed for low-power embedded devices with network capability, such as the Raspberry Pi, but can be installed on almost any Linux machine.

Pi-hole has the ability to block traditional website advertisements as well as advertisements in unconventional places, such as smart TVs and mobile operating system advertisements.

History 
The Pi-hole project was created by Jacob Salmela as an open source alternative to AdTrap in 2014 and was hosted on GitHub. Since then, several contributors have joined the project.

Features 
Pi-hole makes use of a modified dnsmasq called FTLDNS, cURL, lighttpd, PHP and the AdminLTE Dashboard to block DNS requests for known tracking and advertising domains. The application acts as a DNS server for a private network (replacing any pre-existing DNS server provided by another device or the ISP), with the ability to block advertisements and tracking domains for users' devices. It obtains lists of advertisement and tracking domains from a configurable list of predefined sources, and compares DNS queries against them. If a match is found within any of the lists, or a locally-configured blacklist, Pi-hole will refuse to resolve the requested domain and respond to the requesting device with a dummy address.

Because Pi-hole blocks domains at the network level, it is able to block advertisements, such as banner advertisements on a webpage, but it can also block advertisements in unconventional locations, such as on Android, iOS and smart TVs.

Using VPN services, Pi-Hole can block domains without using a DNS filter setup in a router.  Any device that supports VPN can use Pi-Hole on a cellular network or a home network without having a DNS server configured. 

The nature of Pi-hole allows it to also block website domains in general by manually adding the domain name to a blacklist. Likewise, domains can be manually added to a whitelist should a website's function be impaired by domains being blocked. Pi-hole can also function as a network monitoring tool, which can aid in troubleshooting DNS requests and network faults. Pi-hole can also be used to encourage the use of DNS over HTTPS for devices using it as a DNS server with the cloudflared binary provided by Cloudflare.

Difference from traditional advertisement blockers 
Pi-hole functions similarly to a network firewall, meaning that advertisements and tracking domains are blocked for all devices behind it, whereas traditional advertisement blockers only run in a user's browser, and remove advertisements only on the same machine.

See also 
 
 
 Ad blocking
 Online advertising

References

External links
 

Ad blocking software
DNS server software for Linux
Software using the European Union Public Licence
Raspberry Pi